"Compensation" is an essay by Ralph Waldo Emerson. It appeared in his book Essays, first published 1841. In 1844, Essays: Second Series was published, and subsequent republishings of Essays were renamed Essays: First Series.

Summary
The essay addresses the topic of karma or cause and effect. Emerson contends that everywhere in nature there is dualism. Dualism is present within us because it balances life instead of having excess to destroy. Opposites like action/reaction, day/night, up/down, even/odd and spirit/matter are used to balance the universe. We must all use moderation in life, instead of excess which can cause defects in our lives. If there is excess it needs to be moderated for proper balance.

Quotations
"To empty here, you must condense there." 

"There is a crack in every thing God has made."

"Whilst the world is thus dual, so is every one of its parts. The entire system of things gets represented in every particle. There is somewhat that resembles the ebb and flow of the sea, day and night, man and woman, in a single needle of the pine, in a kernel of corn, in each individual of every animal tribe."
"The same dualism underlies the nature and condition of man."

"Every sweet hath its sour; every evil its good. Every faculty which is a receiver of pleasure has an equal penalty put on its abuse. It is to answer for its moderation with its life."

See also 
 "Self-Reliance"

External links
 Text of essay

Philosophy essays
Essays by Ralph Waldo Emerson
1841 essays